Monodia is the sixth album by the Portuguese music composer António Pinho Vargas. It was released in 1995.

Track listing

Personnel
 Quarteto de Cordas Olisipo - strings (tracks 1-4), conducted by Álvaro Salazar (tracks 2-3)
 Pedro Couto Soares - flute (tracks 1-4)
 António Saiote - clarinet (tracks 5-7)
 Francisco José Monteiro - piano (tracks 8-10)
 Christopher Bochmann - conductor (tracks 11-13)

António Pinho Vargas albums
1995 albums